Konstantine Starikovitch (born March 20, 1966) is an American weightlifter. He competed in the men's heavyweight II event at the 1996 Summer Olympics.

References

External links
 

1966 births
Living people
American male weightlifters
Olympic weightlifters of the United States
Weightlifters at the 1996 Summer Olympics
People from Podolsk
20th-century American people
21st-century American people